The 1992 election of members to the Senate of the Philippines was the 24th election to the Senate of the Philippines. It was held on Monday, May 11, 1992. This was the first general election (where all positions were contested) under the 1987 Philippine Constitution. An estimated 80,000 candidates ran for 17,000 posts, from the presidency all the way down to municipal councilors.

Under the transitory provisions of the Philippine constitution, 24 senators were elected in this election. The first 12 senators who garnered the highest votes would have a six-year term while the next 12 senators would also have a three-year term. The Laban ng Demokratikong Pilipino (LDP) got a large share in the Senate race. TV personality and former Quezon City Vice Mayor Vicente Sotto III (also known as Tito Sotto) got the highest number of votes.

Candidates
These were the following tickets:

Not in ticket

Retiring incumbents
 Joseph Estrada (NPC), ran for Vice President of the Philippines and won
Vicente Paterno (PDP–Laban), retired from politics
Aquilino Pimentel Jr. (PDP–Laban), ran for Vice President of the Philippines and lost, ran for senator in 1995 and lost, ran again in 1998 and won
Juan Ponce Enrile (Nacionalista), ran for representative from Cagayan's 1st district and won; ran for senator in 1995 and won
Rene Saguisag (Liberal), originally promised to run for just one term; retired from politics
Jovito Salonga (Liberal), ran for President of the Philippines and lost

Mid-term vacancies 

 Raul Manglapus, appointed as Secretary of Foreign Affairs

Results 
The Laban ng Demokratikong Pilipino (LDP) winning 16 seats, the Nationalist People's Coalition (NPC) winning five, the Lakas-NUCD winning two, and the Liberal Party winning one.

These were the incumbents who won: Lakas's Leticia Ramos-Shahani and Nina Rasul, LDP's Heherson Alvarez, Edgardo Angara, Butz Aquino, Neptali Gonzales, Teofisto Guingona Jr., Ernesto Herrera, Joey Lina, Orlando S. Mercado, and Alberto Romulo, Liberal's Wigberto Tañada, and NPC's John Henry Osmeña and Ernesto Maceda,

Neophyte senators were LDP's Gloria Macapagal Arroyo, Rodolfo Biazon, Blas Ople, Ramon Revilla Sr., Raul Roco, Tito Sotto and Freddie Webb, and NPC's Nikki Coseteng.

Returning was Arturo Tolentino, who last served in the Senate in 1971.

Incumbents who were defeated were LDP's Mamintal A.J. Tamano, Liberal's Victor Ziga, and Nacionalista's Sotero Laurel.

For purposes of counting of terms the three-year terms of those that finished 13th to 24th in this election count as one term, just as those who have six-year terms

Key:
 ‡ Seats up
 + Gained by a party from another party
 √ Held by the incumbent
 * Held by the same party with a new senator
^ Vacancy

Tally of votes
The first 12 elected candidates were to serve from June 30, 1992, until June 30, 1998, while the following 12 elected candidates were to serve from June 30, 1992, until June 30, 1995.

Per party

Political parties in 1992
 LDP - Laban ng Demokratikong Pilipino
 Lakas-NUCD - Lakas Tao–National Union of Christian Democrats
 NPC - Nationalist People's Coalition
 LP-PDP–Laban - Liberal Party–Partido ng Demokratikong Pilipino-Lakas ng Bayan
 NP - Nacionalista Party
 KBL - Kilusang Bagong Lipunan
 PRP - People's Reform Party

See also
Commission on Elections
Politics of the Philippines
Philippine elections
President of the Philippines
9th Congress of the Philippines

References

External links
 The Philippine Presidency Project
 Official website of the Commission on Elections
 Official website of the House of Representatives 

1992
1992 elections in the Philippines